Fernando Marín may refer to:

 Fernando Marín (businessman), Colombian businessman, engineer and ambassador
 Fernando Marín (footballer) (born 1971), Spanish footballer